Mario Čutura (born 24 April 1978) is a Croatian retired football midfielder who last played for Prva HNL side Croatia Sesvete in the 2008–09 season before being released in July 2009.

International career
Internationally Čutura was capped three times for Croatia U20 and Croatia U21 teams.

References

External links
Mario Čutura profile at the Croatian Football Federation website
Mario Čutura profile at Nogometni Magazin 

1978 births
Living people
Sportspeople from Vinkovci
Association football midfielders
Croatian footballers
Croatia youth international footballers
Croatia under-21 international footballers
HNK Cibalia players
GNK Dinamo Zagreb players
NK Zagreb players
NK Croatia Sesvete players
Croatian Football League players